Burden is a village in the commune of Erpeldange, in northern Luxembourg.

Burden is accessible by car via Warken and Bourscheid. It is connected for unmotorized traffic to the N27 road with a Bailey bridge.

Diekirch (canton)
Towns in Luxembourg